Keely Cashman (born April 4, 1999) is an American World Cup alpine ski racer. She represented the United States at the 2022 Winter Olympics.

Career
Cashman made her World Cup debut in January 2017. She competed at the 2020 World Junior Alpine Skiing Championships where she won a bronze medal in the combined discipline.

Cashman qualified for the 2021 FIS Alpine World Ski Championships, however, she missed the competition due to injury. During training for the 2020–21 season, she crashed and was unconscious and suffered brain damage. She was hospitalized for eight days following her crash, as she sustained a minor MCL strain, hematoma in both hips, and a temporary loss of feeling in her foot from bruising. As a result, this ended her season early.

Cashman represented the United States at the 2022 Winter Olympics, where she finished 27th in the super-G and 17th in the downhill, the top American finisher.

Results

Olympic games

United States championships

United States giant slalom champion in 2019

References

External links
 

1999 births
Living people
American female alpine skiers
People from Sonora, California
Alpine skiers at the 2016 Winter Youth Olympics
Alpine skiers at the 2022 Winter Olympics
Olympic alpine skiers of the United States
Sportspeople from California